El Triunfo ("the triumph" in Spanish) may refer to:

 Ecuador:
El Triunfo, Ecuador (Guayas province)
 El Salvador:
El Triunfo, Usulután
Puerto El Triunfo (Usulután department)
 Honduras: 
El Triunfo, Choluteca 
 Mexico:
El Triunfo, Chiapas 
El Triunfo, Michoacán 
El Triunfo, Tabasco
El Triunfo Biosphere Reserve (Chiapas)
El Triunfo, Baja California Sur

See also
 Triunfo (disambiguation)